Angela Diller (August 1, 1877 – May 1, 1968) was a pianist and music educator.

Early life and education 
Mary Angela Diller was born on August 1, 1877, to William Augustus Muhlenberg Diller and Mary Abigail Welles. She was the youngest of four children. Diller taught herself how to play the piano at an early age. Her older sister Ellen taught her how to read sheet music. As a teenager, she received lessons from Alice Fowler between 1892 and 1895.

Career 
In 1899, she founded the Diller-Quaile Institute with Elizabeth Quaile. Diller and Quaile wanted books for the teachers at the school and wrote the Diller-Quaile Series. In 1932 and 1937 respectively, she wrote The Story of Wagner's Lohengrin, and The Story of Verdi's Aïda. Both books, published by G. Schirmer, contained musical excerpts with printed music.  In 1941 Diller retired from managing the school.

Personal life 
Diller was raised an Episcopalian and was influenced by New Thought. She never married and was childless.

Death 
Near the end of her life, she lived in the Courtland Gardens Health Center in Stamford, Connecticut. Her funeral was held by her nieces and nephews.

References 

1877 births
1968 deaths
American women pianists
American women music educators